Nuria Marín Font (Vielha e Mijaran, Lleida, September 29, 1981) is a Spanish television presenter, journalist, scriptwriter, editor and program coordinator who has spent most of her career at Mediaset España.

Biography 
Nuria studied journalism at Ramon Llull University between 1999 and 2003 and started working as a scriptwriter for the program Kaos on Citytv. She linked this job with that of editor for Super Pop magazine, where she worked for 3 years. Later, in 2008, she started working as a scriptwriter for the program Condició Femenina on Canal Català.

After a short time at the autonomous channel, she began working as coordinator of entertainment programs at La Fábrica de la Tele. For this company, she has worked on programs such as Sálvame, La Caja, El quinto poder, El comecocos or Dale al REC, all on Mediaset España. Her debut as a presenter was in 2013 by the hand of Cazamariposas and, together with Nando Escribano, a program broadcast daily on Divinity and some days on Telecinco and Cuatro, in which she remained until its cancellation in 2020. She also presents and covers various galas and events on Divinity.

Her signing as a collaborator of  Hable con ellas on Telecinco was announced in 2016. In July 2017, she signed on as a presenter of Mad in Spain, alongside Jordi González on Telecinco. She joined Sábado Deluxe as a temporary collaborator in January 2018, and on August 3 of that year, she debuted as a substitute presenter of Sálvame.

In February 2020, she began presenting the new Divinity and Cuatro program, La habitación del pánico. That same year, she presented Más tiempo de descuento and La casa fuerte, in addition to co-presenting the programs Hormigas blancas and La última cena''.

Career

References

External links 
 Nuria Marín on Instagram

University Ramon Llull alumni
Spanish television presenters
Living people
1981 births